Jean Pierre Roma was a French settler from the 18th century who settled at Three Rivers Roma which is now a National Historic Site of Canada. It is located within what is now the small community of Brudenell, Prince Edward Island. The province was then called Ile St. Jean by the French to establish a trade operation.

References

External links

 Synopsis of a biography of Jean Pierre Roma, by Jill MacLean
 Article about The Three Rivers (Cardigan, Brudenell and Valleyfield-Montague)
 http://www.theguardian.pe.ca/index.cfm?sid=274288&sc=102
 http://www.roma3rivers.com

Settlers of Canada